The 2nd Aerobic Gymnastics European Championships was held in Zaragoza, Spain, November 23–25, 2001.

Results

Medal table

References
Results 1
Results 2

Aerobic Gymnastics European Championships
2001 in gymnastics
International gymnastics competitions hosted by Spain
2001 in Spanish sport